Ignacio Martín may refer to:

 Ignacio Martín (rugby union) (born 1983), Spanish rugby sevens player
 Nacho Martín (basketball) (born 1983), Spanish basketball player 
 Nacho Martín (footballer, born 1962), Spanish football player
 Nacho Martín (footballer, born 2002), Spanish football player
 Ignacio Martín (politician), Spanish politician
 Ignacio Martín-Baró, Salvadorian priest